John James Bernard (J.B.) Malone (13 December 1913 – 17 October 1989) was an Irish hill-walking enthusiast who popularised the pastime through his television programmes and books. He was responsible for the establishment of the Wicklow Way as a recognised walking trail, having first proposed it in 1966.

Early years
Malone was born in 1913 in Leeds, England, to James Bernard Malone and his wife, Agnes (née Kenny), both from Dublin. He was raised mainly in England and completed his secondary education at the Marist Brothers College, Grove Ferry, Kent.

Working life
Malone moved to Ireland in 1931 where he found employment in a builders’ providers firm and an insurance company before joining the Irish Army in 1940. There he became a cartographer in the intelligence section. In 1947, having left the army, he went to work at the Department of Posts and Telegraphs as a draughtsman. Malone remained employed in the Irish civil service until his retirement in 1979.

Hill-walking

Malone started hill-walking in 1931 when he climbed Montpelier Hill to visit the ruins of the Hellfire Club. Later, while on leave during his military career, he developed a detailed knowledge of walking routes throughout the Wicklow hills.  Malone sat on the Board of An Taisce in Ireland from 1970 to 1974.

Wicklow Way 

Following his retirement from the civil service, he was appointed as a field officer with the Long Distance Walking Routes Committee of Cospóir, the National Sports Council. There, he negotiated rights of way with land-owners to enable his vision of the Wicklow Way to become a reality. Malone first proposed a guided walking route through the Wicklow hills in 1966, although he had first raised the idea as early as 1942.

Writing 
From 1938 to 1975 Malone contributed a regular column to the Evening Herald entitled Over the Hills.

During the 1960s, Malone presented a television documentary series on RTÉ entitled Mountain and Meadow, in which, accompanied by a cameraman, he introduced viewers to a variety of hill walks in Wicklow and surrounding counties. In 1980, he presented a one-hour TV programme on the newly opened Wicklow Way.

From 1950 to 1988, Malone wrote several books on hillwalking in the Dublin Mountains and the Wicklow Mountains.

Awards and honours
In 1980, Malone was made an honorary life member of An Óige, the Irish Youth Hostel Association, in recognition of his contribution to promoting the Irish countryside.

Following his death in 1989, Malone's contribution to hill-walking in Ireland was marked by the erection of the J.B. Malone  Memorial Stone plaque in his honour on a section of the Wicklow Way overlooking Lough Tay.

In October 2014, on the 25th anniversary of Malone's death, the South Dublin Libraries held an exhibition on his life and work.

Personal life
Malone married Margaret Garry in 1947 and they had three children. He died at St. James's Hospital, Dublin at the age of 75 and is buried in Bohernabreena Cemetery, Tallaght.

Publications

See also
 Lists of long-distance trails in the Republic of Ireland
 Wicklow Way

References

External links
J.B. Malone Exhibition Displays and Slides, South Dublin Libraries (2014)

1913 births
1989 deaths
The Herald (Ireland) people
Hikers
Irish civil servants
Irish columnists
Irish non-fiction writers
Irish Army soldiers
RTÉ television presenters
20th-century non-fiction writers
British emigrants to Ireland